The Albatross Ladies Open (also called the Mercedes-Benz Ladies Open and Bridgestone Ladies Open) was a women's professional golf tournament on the Swedish Golf Tour played annually from 1999 until 2001 at the Albatross Golf Club in Gothenburg, Sweden.

Winners

References

Swedish Golf Tour (women) events
Golf tournaments in Sweden
Defunct sports competitions in Sweden
Recurring sporting events established in 1999
Recurring sporting events disestablished in 2001